There are other places called Meelick in County Galway and County Mayo.

Meelick is a small village in County Clare, Ireland, situated a few kilometres north of Limerick in the Mid-West Region.

History
From 1956, the area was home to 161 Hungarian refugees fleeing the Soviet repression in that country (see 1956 Hungarian Revolution). They were housed in Knockalisheen Camp, a disused army barracks dating from the Emergency. In 1957, complaints and disputes between the refugees and the authorities over living conditions and enforced idleness led to a mass hunger strike. After three days, the Dáil and the Irish Red Cross negotiated an end to the strike. By the summer of 1958, most of the refugees were allowed to move to Germany and the USA while a few chose to remain in Ireland. During their stay at the camp, the 51 children attended the local St Munchin's Girls' School where they were taught both the English and Irish languages. Since the 1990s the camp has again been used to house asylum seekers, now mostly from African countries.

Community
The village has a local GAA club and a community centre. The village also had a tavern and shop although both have now closed.

Historically the village of Meelick was located in an area commonly known as Stonepark, where the church and school are situated. However, during the early 1980s, the development of housing estates began where the majority of Meelick residents now live. Before this, Meelick didn't even warrant a place on the map and even with the development of new housing and the resulting population boost, Meelick can still be seen on very few maps. The three main housing estates built were Ballycannon Heights, Elton Court and Kylevoher. With the turn of the 20th century, two new estates, Elmwood and Glen Abhainn were developed. Other residential areas near Meelick include Cappantymore, Moneen, Stonepark (the original village location), Woodcock Hill and Ballycannon North.

People
Michael Brennan (Lieutenant-General), the Irish Defence Forces Chief of Staff 1931-1940, was born in Meelick.

See also
 List of towns and villages in Ireland

References

Towns and villages in County Clare